Las Mestas is a hamlet and alqueria located in the municipality of Ladrillar, in Cáceres province, Extremadura, Spain. As of 2020, it has a population of 43.

Geography 
Las Mestas is located 165km north-northeast of Cáceres, Spain.

References

Populated places in the Province of Cáceres